Mount Cervin is a small rocky hill,  high, on the east side of Petrel Island in the Geologie Archipelago. It was charted in 1951 by the French Antarctic Expedition and named by them for the Matterhorn ("Mont Cervin" in French), which it resembles in form.

References
 

Mountains of Adélie Land